Maly Kislyay is a rural locality (a settlement) in Nizhnekislyayskoye Rural Settlement, Buturlinovsky District, Voronezh Oblast, Russia. The population was 325 as of 2010. There are 2 streets.

Geography 
Maly Kislyay is located 39 km west of Buturlinovka (the district's administrative centre) by road. Nizhny Kislyay is the nearest rural locality.

References 

Rural localities in Buturlinovsky District